Anything Goes is an album by bassist Ron Carter recorded at Rudy Van Gelder's Studio in New Jersey in 1975 and released on the Kudu label.

Reception

Allmusic reviewer Thom Jurek states "Anything Goes is a studied and even delightful exercise in the commercial aspect of funky jazz fusion. More interested in extrapolated grooves and pretentious motherchopper riffs... Carter cut a record that was as easy to dance to as it was to admire for the quality of its playing... In all, this is a pumping little record, indicative of a forgotten era".

Track listing
All compositions by Ron Carter except where noted.
 "Anything Goes" (Cole Porter) - 5:24 
 "De Samba" - 5:49 
 "Baretta's Theme (Keep Your Eye on the Sparrow)" (Dave Grusin, Morgan Ames) - 5:06 
 "Can't Give You Anything (But My Love)" (Luigi Creatore, Hugo Peretti, George David Weiss) - 5:10 
 "Quarto Azul" - 6:55 
 "Big Fro" - 5:06 
Recorded at Van Gelder Studio in Englewood Cliffs, New Jersey in June and July 1975

Personnel 
 Ron Carter - bass, piccolo bass, arranger
Randy Brecker - trumpet
Alan Rubin - trumpet, flugelhorn
Barry Rogers - trombone
Michael Brecker - tenor saxophone
Phil Woods - alto saxophone
David Sanborn - alto saxophone
Hubert Laws - flute
Don Grolnick - electric piano
Richard Tee - organ
Eric Gale - electric guitar
Steve Gadd (track 1), Jimmy Madison (tracks 2-6) - drums
Ralph MacDonald - congas, percussion
 George Devens, Arthur Jenkins - percussion
Patti Austin, Marilyn Jackson, Maeretha Stewart - vocals (tracks 1 & 6)
Dave Matthews - arranger

References

1975 albums
Kudu Records albums
Ron Carter albums
Albums arranged by David Matthews (keyboardist)
Albums produced by Creed Taylor
Albums recorded at Van Gelder Studio